Harlan & Alondra is the debut studio album by American rapper Buddy. It was released on July 20, 2018, by RCA Records.

Background
The album was produced by Mike & Keys, Brody Brown, Roofeeo, Jake One, DJ Khalil, and Jahaan Sweet, Scoop DeVille. Guest features include ASAP Ferg, Ty Dolla Sign, Snoop Dogg, Khalid and Guapdad 4000.

Singles
On March 7, 2018, Buddy released the first single from titled "Black", with an accompanying music video coming out the following week. On May 10, the second single "Trouble on Central" was released, and a video after the album's release. In June and July, he put out two more songs, "Hey Up There" and "Trippin'", to further promote the project.

Critical reception

Writing for Pitchfork, Briana Younger said "Buddy emerges as one of the region’s most versatile artists. Like a bluesman who still believes things get better, he offsets their often weighty revelations masked in revelry with something that feels more soothing. Part conversation and part confessional, Harlan & Alondra is an alternative take on one of pop culture’s most fabled cities. Buddy drops the top and extends an invitation to ride with him, reminding us along the way that though it may not always be sunny by the beach, it’s always worthwhile."

Track listing
Credits adapted from Tidal

Notes
 signifies a co-producer
"Real Life Shit", "Legend", "Speechless" and "Young" features background vocals from Rose Gold
"Hey Up There" features background vocals from Kent Jamz
"Trouble on Central" features background vocals from Joyce Wrice
"The Blue" features background vocals from Quiñ and Terrace Martin
"Young" interpolates "Liberation" performed by Outkast and Cee-lo

References

2018 debut albums
Albums produced by Pharrell Williams
Albums produced by DJ Khalil
Albums produced by Jake One
Albums produced by Scoop DeVille
Albums produced by Terrace Martin
G-funk albums
RCA Records albums